This table displays the top-rated primetime television series of the 1973–74 season as measured by Nielsen Media Research.

References

1973 in American television
1974 in American television
1973-related lists
1974-related lists
Lists of American television series